Daħlet Qorrot Bay is a small bay found in the north of Gozo, Malta between Qala and Nadur. The beach is rocky in summer but in winter it is always covered with algae. In this bay, you can find several boathouses which had been dug in the soft limestone. The rock is filled with fossils and this makes Daħlet Qorrot a geological hot spot. 

Nadur
Qala,_Malta
Bays of Malta
Beaches of Malta